Brachypeplus glaber is a species of sap-feeding beetle in the family Nitidulidae. It is found in North America.

References

 Grouvelle, A. / Schenkling, S., ed. (1913). "Pars 56: Byturidae, Nitidulidae". Coleopterorum Catalogus, 223.
 Habeck, Dale H. / Arnett, Ross H. Jr., Michael C. Thomas, Paul E. Skelley, and J. H. Frank, eds. (2002). "Family 77. Nitidulidae Latreille 1802". American Beetles, vol. 2: Polyphaga: Scarabaeoidea through Curculionoidea, 311–315.
 Parsons, Carl T. (1943). "A revision of Nearctic Nitidulidae (Coleoptera)". Bulletin of the Museum of Comparative Zoology, vol. 92, no. 3, 121–278.

Further reading

 Arnett, R.H. Jr., M. C. Thomas, P. E. Skelley and J. H. Frank. (eds.). (2002). American Beetles, Volume II: Polyphaga: Scarabaeoidea through Curculionoidea. CRC Press LLC, Boca Raton, FL.
 
 Richard E. White. (1983). Peterson Field Guides: Beetles. Houghton Mifflin Company.

External links

 NCBI Taxonomy Browser, Brachypeplus glaber

Nitidulidae